Actinia striata is a species of sea anemone endemic to the Mediterranean Sea.

Description
Actinia striata is a solitary sea anemone. The crown consists of six whorls of tentacles making 196 tentacles in all. The column is variable in colour, smooth and finely striated, reddish, dull green or brown, with darker streaks. The tentacles are reddish or greenish and the oral disc is plain red and somewhat transparent. The tentacles can be fully retracted, and then the sea anemone resembles a striped gelatinous mound.

Distribution and habitat
This species is endemic to the western Mediterranean Sea. Its range includes the Mediterranean coasts of Spain and France, Italy, Greece, Croatia and Morocco. It can occur at greater depths than Actinia mediterranea or Actinia equina.

Biology
Like other sea anemones, it is carnivorous, feeding on zooplankton which it catches with its tentacles, which thrust the prey into the mouth. It is a generally uncommon species. The sexes are separate and it is viviparous, with breeding probably taking place in summer.

Status
Actinia striata is found in very shallow water in the Mediterranean Sea and nowhere else. The International Union for Conservation of Nature has assessed its conservation status as being "data deficient" because too little is known about its distribution or population size, and its status. Because of the shallowness of the water in which it lives, it is likely to be affected by the discharge of untreated sewage and deteriorating water quality. However, it is present in several marine protected areas. More research needs to be undertaken to identify the threats that it faces.

References

External links
 

Actiniidae
Animals described in 1907